Doselia is a genus of hemiepiphytic lianas belonging to the Solandreae tribe of the nightshade family, Solanaceae. The species belonging to this genus are endemic to the premontane forests of the Colombian and Ecuadorian Andes.

Description
The genus was characterized from congeners based on the membranous leaves, the eglandular simple trichomes that are usually sparsely pubescent, pseudo-verticillate leaf arrangement, and the few-flowered inflorescences that are elongated, and pendulous, bearing showy flowers and conical fruits.

Species
Doselia epifita (S.Knapp) A.Orejuela & Särkinen
Doselia huilensis (A.Orejuela & J.M.Vélez) A.Orejuela & Särkinen
Doselia lopezii (Hunz.)A.Orejuela & Särkinen
Doselia galilensis A.Orejuela & Villanueva

Etymology
The genus name, Doselia, derives from the Spanish word, dosel which means canopy referring to the hemiepiphytic lianescent habit of all species of Doselia, wherein the branches rise high up to the canopy making the species challenging to see unless the plants are bearing their showy pendulous flowers.

References

Solanoideae
Solanaceae genera